Cain's Jawbone is a murder mystery puzzle written by Edward Powys Mathers under the pseudonym "Torquemada". The puzzle was first published in 1934 as part of The Torquemada Puzzle Book. Crowdfunding publisher Unbound published a new stand-alone edition of the puzzle in 2019 in collaboration with the charity The Laurence Sterne Trust. Both editions, when published, were accompanied by a competition which offered a cash prize to the first reader to solve the puzzle. Cain's Jawbone has been described as "one of the hardest and most beguiling word puzzles ever published."

Title
The phrase Cain's Jawbone refers to the Biblical stories of Cain and Abel and Samson.

Puzzle
The puzzle consists of a 100-page prose narrative with its pages arranged in the wrong order. The first edition is part of a hardback book. The second edition is a boxed set of page-cards. To solve the puzzle, the reader must determine the correct order of the pages and also the names of the murderers and victims within the story. The story's text includes a large number of quotations, references, puns, Spoonerisms and other word games. The solution to the puzzle has never been made public.

Competitions
When the puzzle was first published in 1934, a prize of £15 was offered "to the first reader who could re-order the pages and provide an account of the 6 persons murdered in Cain's Jawbone and the full names of their murderers." Two people, Mr S. Sydney-Turner and Mr W. S. Kennedy, solved the puzzle in 1935 and won £25 each.

The publishers of the 2019 edition ran the competition a second time, saying "The prize of £1,000 (roughly how much £15 was worth in 1934) will be given to the first reader to provide the names of the murderers and the murdered, the correct order of the pages and a short explanation of how the solution was obtained. The competition will run for one year from the date of publication." In November 2020 it was announced that comedian and crossword compiler John Finnemore had correctly solved the puzzle, doing so over a period of six months during the COVID-19 lockdown. Finnemore said "The first time I had a look at it I quickly thought 'Oh this is just way beyond me.' The only way I'd even have a shot at it was if I were for some bizarre reason trapped in my own home for months on end, with nowhere to go and no-one to see. Unfortunately, the universe heard me".

References

British books
Puzzle books
1934 books
Victor Gollancz Ltd books